Frederick Douglass Jr. (March 3, 1842 – July 26, 1892) was the second son of Frederick Douglass and his wife Anna Murray Douglass. Born in New Bedford, Massachusetts, he was an abolitionist, essayist, newspaper editor, and an official recruiter of colored soldiers for the United States Union Army during the American Civil War.

Early life
Frederick Jr. was the third eldest of five children born to the Douglass family, comprising three sons and two daughters. As a youngster while still under his parents' roof he joined them as active members and conductors of the Underground railroad, receiving fugitives at their Rochester, New York home; feeding and clothing them, and providing safe, warm shelter as they made their way from bondage to freedom, which for many of these meant escape to Canada. Years later, his younger brother Charles would recall: “We have often had to get up at midnight to admit a sleigh-load and start fires to thaw the fugitives out. Every member of the family had to lend a hand to this work and it was always cheerfully performed.” The first residence for his family was at the house of Nathan and Polly Johnson, who were African-Americans who regularly sheltered people seeking freedom from slavery at their home. They stayed with the Johnsons in New Bedford, Massachusetts from 1838 to 1839.

Military service
During the American Civil War, Frederick Jr. joined his father as a recruiter of United States Colored Troops for the Union Army and was commissioned a Recruiting Sergeant, attached to the U.S. 25th Colored Infantry. Although he himself was never a combat soldier during the intrastate conflict, as were his two brothers, he was proud to have been a recruiter in behalf of the Union cause, especially regarding the famous 55th Massachusetts Infantry Regiment. As such, he worked closely with his renowned father who had been the foremost civilian recruiter for the 54th Massachusetts Infantry Regiment, and who had also served as a consultant and advisor to President Abraham Lincoln on the enlistment of men of color into the Union Army, in supporting the Commander in Chief's objective of reinforcing the North's armed forces to put down the rebellion of the break-away Confederate States. Both his older brother Lewis Henry Douglass and younger brother Charles Remond Douglass were among the first enlistees in that famed regiment. Charles, in fact, was the very first man of color to enlist from the State of New York.

Career
As was true of his world-renowned father, as well as his two brothers, Frederick Jr., lived many lives in one. He was both a printer and editor, having learned these skills while working as an apprentice on his father's newspaper The North Star, later known as Frederick Douglass' Paper.  Together with his father and his brother Lewis, he became co-editor of the New Era or New National Era, a journal published specifically for freedmen, post–Civil War freed slaves between the years 1870 to 1874. This post-abolitionist journal shared much in common purpose with an earlier journal The National Era, also published in Washington, D.C., between the years 1847 to 1860. It was this paper that had serialized the stories that would become Uncle Tom's Cabin, written by Harriet Beecher Stowe. Like his older brother Lewis, he was also a trained typesetter, having completed formal training at Denver, Colorado. His younger brother Charles would later become the first typesetter employed by the U.S. Government Printing Office at Washington, D.C. When his father, Frederick Douglass Sr., was appointed United States Marshal by President Rutherford B. Hayes in the year 1877, Frederick Jr. was made a bailiff and later attained a clerkship in the office of the Recorder of Deeds during his father's tenure in that role for the District of Columbia. The senior Douglass had been nominated to this office by President James Garfield in 1881, serving in that office until his resignation following the inauguration of President Grover Cleveland in 1885.

Personal life

On August 4, 1869, Virginia Hewlett Douglass and Frederick Douglass, Jr. married in Cambridge, Massachusetts. Together they had seven children, Fredrick Aaron Douglass (1870–1886), Virginia Anna Douglass (1871–1872), Lewis Emmanuel Douglass (c.1874–1875), Maud Ardell Douglass (1877–1877), Gertrude Pearl Douglass (1883–1887), Robert Smalls Douglass (1886–1910), Charles Paul Douglass (1879–1895).

Death
Frederick Douglass Jr. died on July 26, 1892, and was initially interred at Graceland Cemetery, beside his beloved wife Virginia Hewlett who had preceded him in death on December 14, 1889. This later changed with the closing of  Graceland Cemetery in 1894; the remains were exhumed and removed to Woodlawn Cemetery in the Benning Ridge section of Washington, D.C.

Regarding his application for a clerkship in the office of the Recorder of Deeds 
The following represents correspondence between Frederick Douglass jr., and District of Columbia Register of Deeds, Simon Wolf. It goes on to describe content of the cover letter accompanying his application for a clerkship within that office.

"Yesterday Simon Wolf, Esq., the newly appointed register of deeds, received the following letter from Frederick Douglass, jr., a brother of Mr. [Charles] Douglass, at the Government office (and not the 'colored printer at the Government office,' as erroneously stated in the 'Star of yesterday). The letter will be read with interest at this time:"

The following is the official reply:

Citations

General sources

Further reading
 
 Reprinted as 
 Douglass, Frederick, Narrative of the Life of Frederick Douglass, an American Slave, Anti-Slavery Office, 1845.

External links
 Frederick Douglass' family and the roots of social justice
 Frederick Douglass in Washington, D.C.: The Lion of Anacostia
 "New Dawn for Freedom"—An exhibition at the Univ. of Cal. Santa Barbra Multicultural Center

African Americans in the American Civil War
Union Army soldiers
1842 births
1892 deaths
People from New Bedford, Massachusetts
Frederick Douglass Jr.
African-American activists
19th-century American newspaper editors
Activists for African-American civil rights
American male journalists
Activists from Rochester, New York
American social reformers
Writers from Rochester, New York
Abolitionists from New Bedford, Massachusetts